Caroline Matilda Warren Thayer (c. 17851844), was an American educator, novelist and children's writer.

Biography 
Caroline Matilda Warren was born in Worcester, Massachusetts, in about 1785 to Ruby Hathaway and William Warren. She was related to the Bunker Hill revolutionary General Joseph Warren.  Thayer married James Thayer on April 10, 1809, in Sutton, Massachusetts. The couple had several children who died in infancy and one son who lived to fight, and die, at the Battle of the Alamo. Her husband also died young.

Thayer worked as an educator and writer focused on religion. She opened a school on Canandaigua Lakein 1818 and became the superintendent of the female division of Wesleyan Seminary in New York City in 1819. However her stay with the Wesleyan Seminary ended when she was dismissed for her associations with New Jerusalem Church in 1821. From there Thayer moved to Joseph Hoxie’s Academy in New York City for several years before moving to teach in Kentucky in 1824. She then became the Governess of Elizabeth Female Academy in Mississippi before opening her own school in Port Gibson in 1831. Later Thayer became the principal of a women's department in Mississippi College.

Thayer died in 1844 and was buried in Harrisonburg, Louisiana.

Bibliography 
 The Gamesters
 Religion Recommended to Youth, in a Series of Letters
 Elegy
 Reflections
 Stanzas
 Ode to Cause of the Greeks
 The Miracle Spring
 First Lessons in the History of the United States
 The widow's son

Sources 

1844 deaths
19th-century American women writers
People from Massachusetts
American children's writers